The 2015 Aegon GB Pro-Series Glasgow was a professional tennis tournament played on indoor hard courts. It was the first edition of the tournament, which was part of the 2015 ATP Challenger Tour. It took place in Glasgow, Scotland from February 3 to February 9, 2015.

Singles main-draw entrants

Seeds 

 Rankings are as of January 19, 2015.

Other entrants 
The following players received wildcards into the singles main draw:
  Daniel Cox
  Ewan Moore
  Daniel Smethurst
  Alexander Ward

The following players received entry from the qualifying draw:
  Pirmin Haenle
  Matwé Middelkoop
  Joshua Milton
  Marcus Willis

Champions

Singles 

  Niels Desein def.  Ruben Bemelmans 7–6(7–4), 2–6, 7–6(7–4)

Doubles 

  Wesley Koolhof /  Matwé Middelkoop def.  Sergei Bubka /  Aleksandr Nedovyesov 6–1, 6–4

External links 
Official website

Aegon GB Pro-Series Glasgow
Aegon GB Pro-Series Glasgow